Marquel Blackwell (born July 29, 1979) is a former American football quarterback and the current running backs coach for the University of Mississippi.

High school and college career
After playing for Lakewood High School and Dixie Hollins High School in Pinellas County, Florida, Blackwell was the quarterback at the University of South Florida for four seasons. Blackwell became a starter three games into his redshirt freshman season and led South Florida to a 30–12 mark during the Bulls' move from Division I-AA to I-A in 2001. During his college career from 1999 to 2002, he threw for 9,108 yards and 57 touchdowns, and had 1,235 rushing yards and 20 rushing touchdowns. He set most of the school's individual passing records during his time as quarterback; as of 2009, he is also the Bulls' No. 6 career rusher and No. 3 in rushing touchdowns.

Professional career

New York Jets
Blackwell entered the 2003 NFL Draft but was not drafted. He signed with the New York Jets as a rookie free agent but only saw playing time in 1 preseason game in the preseason finale against the Philadelphia Eagles. Blackwell threw for two touchdowns and 111 yards in the first half. He was the Jets' No. 2 QB in week one of the regular season (The Jets released backup Jamie Martin so the club did not have to pay his entire season salary if he was not on the roster Week 1), only to be cut again after week 1 when Martin returned.

Tampa Bay Storm
Blackwell had a brief stint, but did not appear, in the Arena Football League (AFL) with the Tampa Bay Storm.

Tampa Bay Buccaneers
In 2004, Blackwell signed with the Tampa Bay Buccaneers.

Montreal Alouettes
In 2005, Blackwell signed with the Montreal Alouettes of the Canadian Football League (CFL).

Alabama Steeldogs
In 2006, Blackwell signed with the Alabama Steeldogs of the Arena Football 2 (af2), where former Dixie and USF teammate Glenn Davis served as assistant coach.

Blackwell was inducted into the USF Athletic Hall of Fame in 2013.

Coaching career

Early Coaching Career
Following his playing career Blackwell spent two years as the head coach of Freedom High School's football team after one as the offensive coordinator. In 2009 became a program assistant at the University of South Florida where he spent three years. In 2012 he was the running backs coach for Western Kentucky.

Toledo
In 2016 and 2017 Blackwell worked as the running backs coach for Toledo.

West Virginia
On February 15, 2018, Blackwell was named the running backs coach at West Virginia University.

Houston
Blackwell joined Dana Holgorsen at the University of Houston on January 11, 2019 as the co-offensive coordinator and quarterbacks coach. Following the 2019 season, Blackwell was demoted to running backs coach after Houston was 78th in yards per game on offense in 2019. He remained as the running backs coach until after the 2021 season.

Ole Miss
On January 13, 2022 it was announced that Blackwell was to become the new running backs coach at Ole Miss replacing Kevin Smith.

References

1979 births
Living people
American football quarterbacks
South Florida Bulls football players
New York Jets players
High school football coaches in Florida
South Florida Bulls football coaches
Western Kentucky Hilltoppers football coaches
Florida Gators football coaches
Toledo Rockets football coaches
West Virginia Mountaineers football coaches
Houston Cougars football coaches
Ole Miss Rebels football coaches
Dixie Hollins High School alumni